Saint-Fort Dimokoyen (born 7 August 1992) is a Central African Republic football midfielder.

International goals
Scores and results list Central African Republic's goal tally first.

References

1992 births
Living people
People from Bangui
Central African Republic footballers
Central African Republic international footballers
Olympic Real de Bangui players
Association football midfielders